This is a list of Special Protection Areas (SPAs) in Scotland.

Reference
Special Protection Areas – List of sites: Scotland
 
Special protection areas in Scotland